İ, or i, called dotted I or i-dot, is a letter used in the Latin-script alphabets of Azerbaijani, Crimean Tatar, Gagauz, Kazakh, Tatar, and Turkish. All of the languages it is used in also use its dotless counterpart I while not using the basic Latin letter I.

In computing

Usage in other languages

Both the dotted and dotless I can be used in transcriptions of Rusyn to allow distinguishing between the letters Ы and И, which would otherwise be both transcribed as "y", despite representing different phonemes. Under such transcription the dotted İ would represent the Cyrillic І, and the dotless I would represent either Ы or И, with the other being represented by "Y".

See also
 Dotless I, the letter's dotless counterpart
 Tittle: the dot above "i" and "j" in most of the Latin scripts

References

External links
Unicode chart
Tex Texin, Internationalization for Turkish: Dotted and Dotless Letter "I", accessed 15 Nov 2005

I-dot
Turkish language
I